In the American motion picture industry, a wide release (short for nationwide release) is a film playing at the same time at cinemas in most markets across the country. This is in contrast to the formerly common practice of a roadshow theatrical release in which a film opens at a few cinemas in key cities before circulating among cinemas around the country, or a limited release in which a film is booked at fewer cinemas (such as "art house" venues) in larger cities in anticipation of lesser commercial appeal. In some cases, a film that sells well in limited release will then "go wide". Since 1994, a wide release in the United States and Canada has been defined by Nielsen EDI as a film released in more than 600 theaters.

The practice emerged as a successful marketing strategy in the 1970s, and became increasingly common in subsequent decades, in parallel with the expansion of the number of screens available at multiplex cinemas. With the switch to digital formats – lowering the added cost of wide release and increasing the opportunity for piracy – "opening wide" has become the default release strategy for big-budget mainstream films, sometimes expanding to include closely spaced wide releases in various countries, or even simultaneous world-wide release.

History
Prior to the 1980s, most feature films initially opened in major cities such as New York, Los Angeles, Paris, and London, with a small set of prints then circulating as a "roadshow" among cinemas regionally over the course of a few months. The number of prints in circulation would be increased only to accommodate demand for highly popular features, which might be "held over" beyond their originally scheduled run. Many of the most successful major releases during this period were handled this way.

In 1946, David O. Selznick's Duel in the Sun was given a "blitz" release, where it was released simultaneously in a number of theaters in an area or city, with it opening in as many as 54 theaters in one area at the same time. The "blitz" approach had been used for a number of years in the Los Angeles area due to its geographic spread. Advantages of the new release approach included economies of scale on advertising costs and the fact that it allowed an old circus technique of making money and leaving before cinemagoers could realize how bad a film was.  The following year, MGM used a "splash" approach on The Hucksters, opening in 350 theaters before expanding to 1,000 theaters a week later.

In 1952, Terry Turner of RKO introduced "saturation booking" (similar to nationwide release but on a regional scale) on a reissue of King Kong and then expanded this concept with Warner Bros.' The Beast from 20,000 Fathoms (1953), planning to have most of its bookings in its first two months, opening in New York and Los Angeles before expanding to 1,422 theaters within the first week.

Joseph E. Levine, a distributor/exhibitor based in Boston who had worked on the "blitz" release of Duel in the Sun, hired Turner and adopted a similar approach on the 1958 US release of the Italian film Attila, quickly moving 90 prints through regional distribution hubs, renting them to mostly low-end theaters where he could book short runs with favorable box office terms. Booking dense concentrations of venues in a region allowed for the effective use of costly local TV and radio spots. Levine was able to generate over $2 million in US box office theatrical rentals with runs averaging only ten days per screen. Warner Bros. then paid him a $300,000 advance to secure the distribution rights to Hercules. Released the following summer with over 600 prints (175 of these played simultaneously in the greater New York City area) with the assistance of Warner's nationwide network of print exchanges, the film secured $4.7 million in rentals.

In 1974, Tom Laughlin gave The Trial of Billy Jack, a sequel to his independently distributed Billy Jack, one of the widest releases to date, opening in 1,200 theatres in the United States on November 13. The following year, Breakout was the first major studio film to go into wide release in its opening week, with Columbia Pictures distributing 1,325 prints nationwide, combined with a heavy national advertising campaign. The following month, Jaws was released in a similar way on 409 screens, expanding to nearly 1,000 by mid-August in conjunction with nationwide advertising. The modest success of Breakout and the blockbuster success of Jaws led other distributors to follow suit with other mass-market films. In December 1980, Any Which Way You Can beat the record set by Breakout, opening in a record 1,541 theaters.

The growth in the number and size of multiplexes since the 1980s, increasing the availability of screens with more flexible scheduling, facilitated this strategy and, together with the reduction in the number of movie palaces, saw an end to the roadshow release strategy. In 1984, Beverly Hills Cop was the first film playing simultaneously on more than 2,000 screens in the United States and Canada, in its third weekend in December. In 1990, 13 films were shown on 2,000 screens simultaneously, and in 1993 the number had almost doubled to 24. In 1993, 145 films (41% of films released) received a wide release in the United States and Canada with an average widest point of release of 1,493 engagements with 29% of the films' grosses coming from their opening week. 

In May 1996, Mission: Impossible was the first film to be released in over 3,000 theaters in the United States and Canada. Meanwhile, Showgirls (1995) was the first film with an NC-17 rating to have a wide release in the United States, opening in 1,388 theaters. In 1996, 67 films were released on more than 2,000 screens and by 1997, the average widest point of release for wide release films in the United States and Canada had reached 1,888 engagements with 37% of the films' grosses coming from their opening week. By 2000, 22 films were released on more than 3,000 screens in the year, while the average widest point of release had increased to 2,228.

By 2002, opening globally on the same day became more commonplace, with Spider-Man being released on 7,500 screens at 3,615 theaters in the United States and Canada and 838 prints in 18 other countries. The same month, Star Wars: Episode II – Attack of the Clones opened in 3,161 theaters in the United States and Canada, and in 73 other countries on 5,854 screens. In 2003, 20th Century Fox released X2, the second installment of the X-Men film series, in 3,741 theaters in the United States and Canada, and in 93 markets on 7,316 screens overseas. Later that year, Warner Bros. released the third Matrix film, The Matrix Revolutions,  simultaneously in 108 territories on November 5, 2003 at 1400 Greenwich Mean Time on around 18,000 screens with 10,013 prints overseas and in 3,502 theaters in the United States and Canada. Shrek 2 became the first film to open in over 4,000 theaters in the United States and Canada in 2004. The Lion King set the record for the widest opening in the United States and Canada, being released in 4,725 theaters in 2019 before expanding two weeks later to 4,802 theaters.

Classification
Since 1994, a wide release in the United States and Canada has been defined by EDI as a film released in more than 600 theaters. In 1996, Variety considered a wide release as a film with 700 or more playdates or a film in the top 50 markets with at least 500 playdates. New Line distribution president Mitch Goldman called the term a misnomer as he claimed that a film needed to open in more than 800 theaters to be considered a wide release but that such a film might not even play the top cities and that a film could open in the top 50 markets with just 600 prints and be in wide release.

See also
 Art film
 Film release

References

Further reading
 Dade Hayes and Jonathan Bing, Open Wide: How Hollywood Box Office Became a National Obsession, Miramax Books, 2004.

Films by type